The Alpha Incident (also known as The Alien Incident, and Gift from a Red Planet) is a 1978 American science fiction horror film directed by Bill Rebane and starring Ralph Meeker, Stafford Morgan, John F. Goff, Carol Irene Newell, and George "Buck" Flower.

Premise 
A space probe returns to Earth from Mars, carrying with it a deadly organism which has the lethal potential to destroy all life on Earth. Being transported across country by train, the micro-organism is released when a nosy train employee inspects the cargo. This results in an entire train station being quarantined along with government biologist Dr. Sorenson.

Those who are trapped wait for other government scientists to find a cure while trying not to fall asleep―—sleep triggers the microorganism. because that's when the virus strikes. While asleep, the disease causes the brain to swell to the point the skull is fractured.

Although a cure is found, government agents begin killing those who survived the disease as part of a cover up.

Cast 
Ralph Meeker as Charlie
Stafford Morgan as Dr. Sorensen
John F. Goff as Jack Tiller
Carol Irene Newell as Jenny
George "Buck" Flower as Hank (also as Buck Flower)
Paul Bentzen as Dr. Farrell
John Alderman as Dr. Rogers
Ray Szmanda as The Official
Lawrence Ripp as The Guard
Harry Youstos as Alvin

Release

The Alpha Incident was released for the first time on DVD by Mill Creek Entertainment on August 30, 2005 as a part of its 
Chilling Classics: 50 Movie Pack. On August 15, 2006 it was released by Digital 1 Stop, as a part of its 
Nightmare Worlds: 50 Movie Pack. Mill Creek re-released the film on four separate occasions as a part of various multi-film packs in 2007 and 2008. On August 24, 2010, the film was released as a part of a multi-film pack by Tnt Media Group. On September 21, that same year it was released as a single-feature by Synergy Entertainment.

As of November 2021, the full movie is available on YouTube.

Reception

The Alpha Incident received mostly negative reviews upon its release.
Alan Jones from Radio Times rated the film a negative one out of five stars, calling it "[an] over-talky feeble fable". Dan Budnik from Bleeding Skull also criticized the film as being "overly talky", while also criticizing the film's underwritten, and unlikable characters, and sluggish pacing. On his website, Fantastic Movie Musings and Ramblings, Dave Sindelar similarly criticized the film's unlikable characters, with character interactions being "repetitious and tiresome". Sindelar also criticized the film's poor acting, and dialogue.

Creature Feature gave the movie one star, citing many of the same issues in the above review and noting that Ralph Meeker is wasted in the movie and his death scene the only interesting part of the film. The Encyclopedia of Science Fiction noted that director Rebane is known for his low budget movies, and this is neither his best nor his worst.

References

External links 

1978 films
1978 horror films
American science fiction horror films
1970s science fiction horror films
1970s adventure drama films
1970s English-language films
American adventure drama films
Films directed by Bill Rebane
1978 drama films
1970s American films